The rosy-tailed sandstone gecko (Cyrtopodion rhodocauda) is a species of gecko, a lizard in the family Gekkonidae. The species is endemic to Balochistan, Pakistan.

References

Further reading
Baig KJ (1998). "A new species of Tenuidactylus (Sauria: Gekkonidae) from Balochistan, Pakistan". Hamadryad 23 (2): 127-132. (Tenuidactylus rhodocaudus, new species).

Cyrtopodion
Reptiles described in 1998
Reptiles of Pakistan